Tonton Landicho is a Filipino actor. He is the brother of fellow actor Domingo Landicho and the son of Cogie Landicho.

Filmography

Television

Movies
Christine Santiago of Mansion (RCP Productions, 2014) - Dante Alvarez
Lauriana (RCP Productions, 2013) - Isaac Blanco
Skies of Beauty (Sanity Evil Productions, 2004) - Danny Saylor
Erenea (Sanity Evil Productions, 2000) - Ybrahius
Shadow Hunters: Kriminal II (Sanity Evil Productions, 1999) - Merando
Isyanya (Sanity Evil Productions, 1995) - Danilo
Angelito San Miguel: Ang Batang City Jail (Viva Films, 1991) - Javier
Noel Juico: Batang Kriminal (Viva Films, 1991) - Anthony
Imortal (Regal Films, 1989) - Franco
Betrayal: Gunfire (Sanity Evil Productions, 1989) - Crystal

References

External links

Filipino male television actors
Living people
1978 births
Filipino male film actors